Stefan Grützner (born 29 June 1948 in Chemnitz) is an East German former weightlifter who competed in the 1972 Summer Olympics.

References

1948 births
Living people
German male weightlifters
Olympic weightlifters of East Germany
Weightlifters at the 1972 Summer Olympics
Olympic bronze medalists for East Germany
Olympic medalists in weightlifting
Medalists at the 1972 Summer Olympics
Sportspeople from Chemnitz
20th-century German people